Stachys ocymastrum, the Italian hedgenettle, is a species of annual herb in the family Lamiaceae. They have a self-supporting growth form. Flowers are visited by Green-striped White. Individuals can grow to 0.4 m.

References 

ocymastrum
Flora of Malta